The 1972-73 NBA season was the Bulls' 7th season in the NBA.

Offseason

Draft picks

Roster

Regular season

Season standings

z – clinched division title
y – clinched division title
x – clinched playoff spot

Record vs. opponents

Game log

Playoffs

|- align="center" bgcolor="#ffcccc"
| 1
| March 30
| @ Los Angeles
| L 104–107 (OT)
| Bob Love (21)
| Dennis Awtrey (15)
| Dennis Awtrey (6)
| The Forum16,341
| 0–1
|- align="center" bgcolor="#ffcccc"
| 2
| April 1
| @ Los Angeles
| L 93–108
| Bob Love (32)
| Chet Walker (11)
| Tom Boerwinkle (9)
| The Forum17,368
| 0–2
|- align="center" bgcolor="#ccffcc"
| 3
| April 6
| Los Angeles
| W 96–86
| Chet Walker (30)
| Dennis Awtrey (14)
| Norm Van Lier (8)
| Chicago Stadium14,606
| 1–2
|- align="center" bgcolor="#ccffcc"
| 4
| April 8
| Los Angeles
| W 98–94
| Bob Love (38)
| Bob Love (13)
| Bob Love (6)
| Chicago Stadium14,181
| 2–2
|- align="center" bgcolor="#ffcccc"
| 5
| April 10
| @ Los Angeles
| L 102–123
| Bob Love (27)
| Bob Love (14)
| Awtrey, Van Lier (5)
| The Forum17,505
| 2–3
|- align="center" bgcolor="#ccffcc"
| 6
| April 13
| Los Angeles
| W 101–93
| Jerry Sloan (27)
| Dennis Awtrey (14)
| Dennis Awtrey (8)
| Chicago Stadium18,096
| 3–3
|- align="center" bgcolor="#ffcccc"
| 7
| April 15
| @ Los Angeles
| L 92–95
| Norm Van Lier (28)
| Norm Van Lier (14)
| Bob Love (5)
| The Forum17,505
| 3–4
|-

Awards and records
Norm Van Lier, NBA All-Defensive Second Team
Chet Walker, NBA All-Star Game
Bob Love, NBA All-Star Game

References

Chicago
Chicago Bulls seasons
Chicago Bulls
Chicago Bulls